2012 Faroe Islands Premier League was the seventieth season of top-tier football on the Faroe Islands. For sponsorship reasons, it was known as Effodeildin. The season began on 24 March 2012 with a match between B36 Tórshavn and FC Suðuroy, and ended on 6 October 2012. EB/Streymur won their second league title.
B36 Tórshavn were the defending champions.

Teams
07 Vestur and B71 Sandoy had finished 9th and 10th respectively at the end of the previous season and were relegated to the 1. deild as a result. 07 Vestur were relegated after just one season in the league while B71 Sandoy left after a two-year stay.

Replacing them were the 1. deild champions FC Suðuroy and runners-up TB Tvøroyri. FC Suðuroy returned to the top flight after a one-year absence, while TB Tvøroyri returned after a six-year absence.

Team summaries

League table

Positions by round

Results

The schedule consisted of a total of 27 rounds. Each team played three games against every opponent in no particular order. At least one of the games had to be at home and at least one had to be away. The additional home game for every match-up was randomly assigned prior to the season, with the top five teams of the previous season having 5 home games.

Regular home games

Additional home games

Top goalscorers 

Source: Soccerway

Awards

Best Referee:
Lars Müller

Fair Play:
EB/Streymur

Team of the Season
Goalkeeper:  Jákup Mikkelsen (ÍF)
Defenders:  Bárður Hansen (Víkingur),  Bartal Eliasen (ÍF),  Marni Djurhuus (EB/Streymur),  Jan Ó. Ellingsgaard (ÍF)
Midfielders:  Kaj Leo í Bartalsstovu (Víkingur),  Hallur Hansson (HB),  Høgni Madsen (ÍF),  Símun Samuelsen (HB)
Forwards: Arnbjørn Hansen (EB/Streymur),  Clayton Soares (ÍF)

See also
 2012 Faroe Islands Cup

References

External links

 Official website 
 Faroe Islands soccer news, results and information
 Faroe Islands soccer news, results, statistics and information

Faroe Islands Premier League seasons
1
Faroe
Faroe